Azucena is a Spanish surname. Notable people with the surname include:

 Cesario Azucena (1938–2021), Filipino lawyer, professor, management consultant, and author
 Maya Azucena, American singer-songwriter and cultural ambassador

Spanish-language surnames